"I Don't Wanna Be the One" is a song recorded by Canadian country music artist Patricia Conroy. It was released in 1995 as the fourth single from her third studio album, You Can't Resist. It peaked at number 8 on the RPM Country Tracks chart in October 1995.

Chart performance

Year-end charts

References

1994 songs
1995 singles
Patricia Conroy songs
Warner Music Group singles
Songs written by Patricia Conroy